The 1884 United States presidential election in Virginia took place on November 4, 1884, as part of the 1884 United States presidential election. Voters chose 12 representatives, or electors to the Electoral College, who voted for president and vice president.

Virginia voted for the Democratic candidate, New York Governor Grover Cleveland over the Republican candidate, former Secretary of State James G. Blaine. Cleveland won Virginia by a margin of 2.15%.

Results by county

References

Virginia
1884
1884 Virginia elections